The Place of Memory, Tolerance and Social Inclusion (Spanish: Lugar de la Memoria, la Tolerancia y la Inclusión Social, LUM) is a museum in Lima, Peru, dedicated to the Peruvian internal conflict of the 1980s and 1990s. It opened in 2015 and is managed by Peru's Ministry of Culture. The LUM seeks to memorialize the victims of the conflict and provide a forum where different viewpoints on the conflict can be discussed.

History
The Peruvian Truth and Reconciliation Commission called for the creation of commemorative spaces in its 2003 report. In 2009 Germany offered Peru $2 million to construct a memorial museum. President Alan García initially rejected this offer but ultimately accepted it, in the face of pressure from NGOs and political opponents, including Mario Vargas Llosa, then head of the museum planning committee. 

Memory of the internal conflict remains contested in Peru. Willis writes that there are two main narratives of the conflict: "a state-military narrative which emphasises the role of ‘terrorist’ violence in promulgating the conflict, and a human rights narrative which is critical of both insurgent and state violence, while seeking to understand how structural racism shaped the conflict." LUM is identified with the human rights narrative, but the museum's planners sought to incorporate different viewpoints through a consultative process involving surveys and sample audiences from different ideological communities.

See also
The Eye that Cries
Museum of Memory and Human Rights
Yad Vashem

References

Further reading
Memories before the State: Postwar Peru and the Place of Memory, Tolerance, and Social Inclusion. Joseph P. Feldman. New Brunswick: Rutgers University Press, 2021

External links
Official site

Internal conflict in Peru
Military and war museums
Human rights museums
Museums in Lima
History museums
Museums established in 2015